Hamara Sansar is a 1978 Indian Hindi-language film directed by T. Prakash Rao produced under Usha Productions, starring Parikshit Sahni, Nutan, Mithun Chakraborty and Sarika.

Cast
Parikshit Sahni as Pratap
Nutan as Geeta 
Mithun Chakraborty as Prem 
Sarika as Roopa
Agha
Aruna Irani
Shashikala
Om Prakash as Harishchandra
Padmini Kolhapure as Asha

Plot
The story of the film revolves around two brothers who get estranged due to an unfortunate incident. In order to end the feud, the younger sibling, who is a budding singer, sets out to find his older brother.

Soundtrack

References

External links
 
 Hamara Sansar VCD

1978 films
1970s Hindi-language films
Films scored by Ravindra Jain
Films directed by T. Prakash Rao